Henry, the Rainmaker is a 1949 American comedy film directed by Jean Yarbrough and written by Lane Beauchamp. The film stars Raymond Walburn, Walter Catlett, William Tracy, Mary Stuart, Barbara Brown and Gary Gray. The film was released on February 13, 1949, by Monogram Pictures.

Plot

Cast          
Raymond Walburn as Henry Latham
Walter Catlett as Mayor George Colton
William Tracy as Charlie Richards
Mary Stuart as Barbara Latham
Barbara Brown as Mrs. Edna Latham
Gary Gray as David Latham
Addison Richards as Steve Richards
Lois Austin as Mrs. Richards
Georgie Nokes as Georgie Colton
Mary Field as Mrs. Sweeney
Robert Emmett Keane as Seton
Ruth Lee as Schoolteacher
Melinda Byron as Marilyn Loper
Edna Holland as Mrs. Parker
Earle Hodgins as Mr. Peabody
Barton Yarborough as Reverend Bascom
Leonard Bremen as Bum

References

External links
 

1949 films
American comedy films
1949 comedy films
Monogram Pictures films
Films directed by Jean Yarbrough
American black-and-white films
1940s English-language films
1940s American films